Alex Clarke (née Hodge; born 30 September 1977) is an Australian retired netball player. Clarke was a member of the Australian national team that won gold at the 2002 Commonwealth Games in Manchester, England. Domestically, she played 113 matches over 11 years in the Commonwealth Bank Trophy, playing for the Adelaide Thunderbirds, Queensland Firebirds and Sydney Sandpipers. Clarke also played for the Adelaide Thunderbirds in the ANZ Championship. After the 2008 season, Clarke announced her retirement from netball.

References

1977 births
Living people
Adelaide Thunderbirds players
ANZ Championship players
Commonwealth Games gold medallists for Australia
Commonwealth Games medallists in netball
Australia international netball players
Netball players at the 2002 Commonwealth Games
Sydney Sandpipers players
Queensland Firebirds players
Commonwealth Bank Trophy players
Medallists at the 2002 Commonwealth Games